Leslie Donald Butler (born 1912) was an English athlete who competed for England.

Athletics career
He competed in the long jump and triple jump at the 1934 British Empire Games in London.

References

British male triple jumpers
English male triple jumpers
English male long jumpers
Athletes (track and field) at the 1934 British Empire Games
Year of death missing
1912 births
Commonwealth Games competitors for England